Brougham may refer to:

Transport
 Brougham (carriage), a light four-wheeled horse-drawn carriage
 Brougham (car body), an automobile with a similar style

Automobile models
 Cadillac Brougham, 1987–1992
 Chrysler New Yorker Brougham, c. 1972–1977
 Daewoo Brougham, 1991–1997
 Gloria Brougham, 1975–2004
 Holden Brougham, 1968–1971
 Mercury Brougham, 1967–1968
 Nissan Cedric Brougham, 1975–2004

Other transport
 Brougham, a barque hired by the New Zealand Company in 1840
 Ryan Brougham, a single-engined aircraft of the 1920s and 1930s

Places
  Brougham, Cumbria, a civil parish on the outskirts of Penrith 
 Brougham Castle, in the parish
  Brougham, Ontario, Canada, a community within Pickering

People
 Baron Brougham and Vaux, a title in the Peerage of the United Kingdom since 1830
 Henry Brougham, 1st Baron Brougham and Vaux (1778–1868), British statesman
 Doris Brougham (born 1926), Taiwanese educator and Christian missionary
 Henry Brougham (sportsman) (1888–1923), British rackets player
 James Brougham (1780–1833), British politician
 John Brougham (1814–1880), Irish-American actor and dramatist
 Royal Brougham (1894–1978), Washington sports journalist
 Tom Brougham (born 1943), California gay rights activist

Other uses
Brougham (band), short-lived rap/nu metal band in 2000